George Dyer is a British musical director, supervisor and orchestrator.

Before being awarded a scholarship to study musical direction at Mountview Academy of Theatre Arts, Dyer attended Durham University

As Musical Director selected credits include: Annie (Piccadilly Theatre - West End and UK Tours – for which he won a Broadwayworld Award), West Side Story (Curve), The Wizard of Oz (Birmingham Repertory Theatre), Joseph and the Amazing Technicolor Dreamcoat (Kilworth House Theatre), The Wedding Singer (UK Tour & International), Dogfight (European Premiere – for which he won a second Broadwayworld award), The Rise and Fall of Little Voice (Derby Theatre) and Sweeney Todd (a co-production between West Yorkshire Playhouse and Royal Exchange).

In 2017 he created the Arrangements and Orchestrations for the World Premiere of Nativity! The Musical, for which he also continues to serve as Musical Supervisor. The production opened at the Birmingham Repertory Theatre before embarking on a UK Tour, and has had two further Tours in 2018 and 2019, and returns to Birmingham Rep in 2021.

Dyer also created the Orchestrations and Arrangements for the World Premiere of An Officer and a Gentleman The Musical. The production was directed by Nikolai Foster and with a book by the original screenplay writer Douglas Day Stewart. The Production opened at Curve before touring the UK.

Dyer created new orchestrations and arrangements for Annie. They were originally heard in 2015–16 on the UK Tour produced by Michael Harrison and David Ian. These new arrangements and orchestrations were then heard in the South African production, where it won the Naledi Theatre Award for Best Musical. The production then transferred into the Piccadilly Theatre (West End) where the production ran for 9 months (with an expanded Orchestration), originally starring Miranda Hart as Miss Hannigan for which Dyer also served as musical director for the run. The production then played a limited season at the Mirvish Theatre, Toronto, and was lately be seen touring the UK until November 2019, for which Dyer is also Musical Supervisor

Dyer's other recent orchestrations include: West Side Story (Curve), The Wizard of Oz (Birmingham Rep), Merrily We Roll Along (Theatr Clwyd), The Wedding Singer (UK Tour), The Wiz (Birmingham Rep and West Yorkshire Playhouse) and Bugsy Malone (Curve).

Selected credits

References 

Living people
Alumni of the Mountview Academy of Theatre Arts
Alumni of Durham University
Music directors
Music arrangers
1987 births